Shannon Kevin Gugerty (born December 30, 1981) is a retired American mixed martial artist who last competed in the Featherweight division. A professional competitor from 2004 until 2012, he fought four times in the UFC, against notable names like Clay Guida, Terry Etim, and Spencer Fisher. He holds a win over Cub Swanson.

Background
Born and raised in Chula Vista, Gugerty began wrestling his freshman year of high school at the age of 14. As a senior, Gugerty began training in Brazilian jiu-jitsu and Sambo under the tutelage of Dean Lister. Later, Gugerty began training in Muay Thai alongside fighters such as Brandon Vera.

Mixed martial arts career
Gugerty made his MMA debut in 2005, defeating Cub Swanson at Total Combat 4. He went on to appear prominently in Total Combat, then moved upwards to the UFC when he was to appear against the then-undefeated Dale Hartt at UFC Fight Night: Silva vs. Irvin. Gugerty defeated Hartt by submission in the first round.

Gugerty went on to appear against Spencer Fisher at UFC 90, as a last-minute replacement for Melvin Guillard. Fisher submitted Gugerty in the third round via triangle choke. Gugerty would later defeat wrestling specialist Matt Grice at UFC 100 with a guillotine choke in the first round.  
 
Gugerty fought Terry Etim on November 14, 2009, at UFC 105. He lost via submission (guillotine choke) in the second round. Etim had the guillotine locked in for almost 30 seconds before Gugerty tapped.

Gugerty faced Clay Guida on March 21, 2010, at UFC LIVE: Vera vs. Jones, replacing an injured Sean Sherk. Gugerty lost via second round submission. Following his loss to Guida, Gugerty was released from the promotion.

Mixed martial arts record

|-
| Loss
|align=center| 15–7
| Owen Roddy
| Decision (split)
| Cage Contender 21
| 
|align=center| 3
|align=center| 5:00
| Dublin, Ireland
|Featherweight debut; for Cage Contender Featherweight Championship.
|-
| Win
|align=center| 15–6
| Ernie Davila
| Submission (rear-naked choke)
| Desert Rage Full Contact Fighting 10
| 
|align=center| 1
|align=center| 3:59
| Yuma, Arizona, United States
|
|-
| Win
|align=center| 14–6
| Cruz Gomez
| Submission (guillotine choke)
| CFS: The Uprising
| 
|align=center| 1
|align=center| 1:32
| San Diego, California United States
|
|-
| Win
|align=center| 13–6
| Roscoe Jackson
| TKO (punches)
| Desert Rage Full Contact Fighting 8 
| 
|align=center| 1
|align=center| 0:30
| Yuma, Arizona, United States
| 
|-
| Loss
|align=center| 12–6
| Dennis Bermudez
| Decision (unanimous)
| Shine Lightweight Grand Prix
| 
|align=center| 2
|align=center| 5:00
| Newkirk, Oklahoma, United States
| 
|-
| Loss
|align=center| 12–5
| Clay Guida
| Submission (arm-triangle choke)
| UFC Live: Vera vs. Jones
| 
|align=center| 2
|align=center| 3:40
| Broomfield, Colorado, United States
| 
|-
| Loss
|align=center| 12–4
| Terry Etim
| Submission (guillotine choke)
| UFC 105
| 
|align=center| 2
|align=center| 1:24
| Manchester, England
| 
|-
| Win
|align=center| 12–3
| Matt Grice
| Technical Submission (guillotine choke)
| UFC 100
| 
|align=center| 1
|align=center| 2:36
| Las Vegas, Nevada, United States
| 
|-
| Loss
|align=center| 11–3
| Spencer Fisher
| Submission (triangle choke)
| UFC 90
| 
|align=center| 3
|align=center| 3:56
| Rosemont, Illinois, United States
| 
|-
| Win
|align=center| 11–2
| Dale Hartt
| Submission (rear-naked choke)
| UFC Fight Night: Silva vs. Irvin
| 
|align=center| 1
|align=center| 3:33
| Las Vegas, Nevada, United States
| 
|-
| Win
|align=center| 10–2
| Noah Tedesco
| TKO
| Desert Rage 3
| 
|align=center| 1
|align=center| 4:04
| Yuma, Arizona, United States
| 
|-
| Win
|align=center| 9–2
| Johnny Torres
| Submission (guillotine choke)
| Total Combat 27
| 
|align=center| 2
|align=center| N/A
| Yuma, Arizona, United States
| 
|-
| Win
|align=center| 8–2
| Lucas Factor
| TKO (punches)
| TC 25: Fight Club
| 
|align=center| 1
|align=center| 1:05
| San Diego, California, United States
| 
|-
| Win
|align=center| 7–2
| Paris Ruiz
| Submission (rear-naked choke)
| COF 7: Face Off
| 
|align=center| 1
|align=center| N/A
| Tijuana, Mexico
| 
|-
| Win
|align=center| 6–2
| Joe Nicholas
| Submission (triangle choke)
| Total Combat 21
| 
|align=center| 2
|align=center| 1:35
| San Diego, California, United States
| 
|-
| Win
|align=center| 5–2
| Joey Radanzzo
| Submission (strikes)
| TC 18: Nightmare
| 
|align=center| 1
|align=center| 1:52
| San Diego, California, United States
| 
|-
| Win
|align=center| 4–2
| Jose Carillo
| TKO (punches)
| TC 16: Annihilation
| 
|align=center| 1
|align=center| 2:24
| San Diego, California, United States
| 
|-
| Loss
|align=center| 3–2
| Cub Swanson
| TKO (punches)
| TC 13: Anarchy
| 
|align=center| 2
|align=center| 3:40
| Del Mar, California, United States
| 
|-
| Loss
|align=center| 3–1
| Shawn Bias
| Decision (unanimous)
| Total Combat 12
| 
|align=center| 3
|align=center| 5:00
| Tijuana, Mexico
| 
|-
| Win
|align=center| 3–0
| Anthony Griffin
| Submission (armbar)
| Total Combat 9
| 
|align=center| 1
|align=center| N/A
| Tijuana, Mexico
| 
|-
| Win
|align=center| 2–0
| Josue Josue
| Submission (rear-naked choke)
| Total Combat 7
| 
|align=center| 1
|align=center| N/A
| Tijuana, Mexico
| 
|-
| Win
|align=center| 1–0
| Cub Swanson
| Submission (rear-naked choke)
| Total Combat 4
| 
|align=center| 1
|align=center| 0:15
| Tijuana, Mexico
|

Notes and references

External links

1981 births
Living people
American male mixed martial artists
Mixed martial artists from California
Lightweight mixed martial artists
Mixed martial artists utilizing wrestling
Mixed martial artists utilizing sambo
Mixed martial artists utilizing Muay Thai
Mixed martial artists utilizing Brazilian jiu-jitsu
Sportspeople from San Diego
Ultimate Fighting Championship male fighters
American Muay Thai practitioners
American sambo practitioners
American practitioners of Brazilian jiu-jitsu